Cecil Augustus Fitzroy (10 January 1844 – 13 November 1917) was a 19th-century Member of Parliament from the Canterbury region of New Zealand, and later Mayor of Hastings.

Early life

Fitzroy was born in Norfolk, England, in 1844. His father was the Reverend Frederick Thomas William Coke Fitzroy (1808–1862) and his mother was Emilia Le-Strange Styleman. His grandfather was Lt.-Gen. William FitzRoy (1773–1837), and his great-grandfather was Charles FitzRoy, 1st Baron Southampton (1737–1797). He was a distant nephew of Robert FitzRoy, the 2nd Governor of New Zealand, whose grandfather Augustus FitzRoy, 3rd Duke of Grafton was the elder brother of the 1st Baron Southampton. He was educated at Eton and Cambridge.

Canterbury

He emigrated to Australia in 1867 and came to New Zealand soon after, where he was initially a cadet at Mesopotamia Station (previously owned by Samuel Butler) and then settled in Heslerton, Canterbury; the main farm is now known as Northbank homestead, located north of the Rakaia River. In total he spent 12 years in Canterbury.

The dominant topic for the 1875 election was the abolition of the Provinces. William Reeves, the incumbent, favoured the retention of the provincial system of government, whilst Fitzroy was an abolitionist. Fitzroy narrowly won the election in the Selwyn electorate by 14 votes. He represented the Selwyn electorate for one parliamentary term until 1879, when he retired because he had moved to Hastings.

Hawke's Bay
He married Susannah Beetham, the daughter of the portrait painter William Beetham, on 21 February 1878 at St James Church in Lower Hutt; his wife had grown up in Lower Hutt. He thus became brother-in-law with George Beetham, who represented the  electorate at the same time that he represented Selwyn. He moved to Hastings in Hawke's Bay, where he was involved in local politics before becoming mayor from 1894 to 1899. During his mayoralty, a system of surface drainage was undertaken. He was only opposed once for the mayoralty. He was also on the Hawkes Bay Education Board and the local A & P Association. He was secretary of the Hawkes Bay Club and served for 20 years on the Hawkes Bay Acclimatisation society. He had a seat on the Hospital Board.

He later moved to Havelock North, where he died. He was survived by his wife. She died in 1940 and is buried at Havelock North Cemetery.

Notes

References

1844 births
1917 deaths
People educated at Eton College
Alumni of the University of Cambridge
Members of the New Zealand House of Representatives
Unsuccessful candidates in the 1896 New Zealand general election
Unsuccessful candidates in the 1899 New Zealand general election
Mayors of Hastings, New Zealand
New Zealand MPs for South Island electorates
19th-century New Zealand politicians